New Sirwan Sports Club also written is a sports club based in Sulaymaniyah, Iraqi Kurdistan, Iraq. Sirwan is the Kurdish meaning of Roaring Sea. They currently play in the Kurdish Premier League.

External links
 Club's page on Goalzz.com

1970 establishments in Iraq
Football clubs in Sulaymaniyah